Olmsted Falls is a city in Cuyahoga County, Ohio, United States, and a southwestern suburb of Cleveland. The population was 9,024 at the 2010 census. The city's main business district is located at the corners of Bagley and Columbia Roads, and contains the Grand Pacific Junction, an historic district.

Geography

Olmsted Falls is located at  (41.367626, -81.904818).

History
After contact with the New World, the land that became Olmsted Falls was originally part of the French colony of Canada (New France), which was ceded in 1763 to Great Britain and renamed Province of Quebec. In the late 18th century the land became part of the Connecticut Western Reserve in the Northwest Territory, then was purchased by the Connecticut Land Company in 1795.

In 1806, the vast tract of land comprising present-day Olmsted Falls, North Olmsted, and Olmsted Township was purchased for $30,000 by Aaron Olmsted, a wealthy sea captain. While he sold off portions of the land which eventually became known as Kingston, Aaron Olmsted named the new town as Olmsted in honor of his brother Charles, one of the original lands purchasers.

Olmsted Falls was farmed in 1814 by James Geer who eventually built a home the following year about where the CSX Railroad now crosses State Route 252 (Columbia Road).  That portion was known as Westview after Calvin and Lmul Hoadley built a mill on the Rocky River in West View.

The whole tract purchased by Aaron Olmsted in 1806, including portions of what is now North Olmsted, North Ridgeville and Middleburg Heights.  Later, at least three sawmills were built along the Rocky River in Olmsted falls, becoming the main industry, after farming.  The first was built by Watrous Usher, around 1825 near the center of the village.  A second was built on Columbia Road by N. P. Loomis around 1836.  Tom Stokes and Sylvester Alcott operated a third mill sometime before 1873.

In 1970 a group of residents sought to merge Olmsted Falls and Westview Village. The suggested contract was approved by over 90% of voters in each community.  The name Westview, while not on any historic maps, exists through the comic strip Funky Winkerbean drawn by West View native Tom Batiuk.

Olmsted Falls was declared a city in 1970, having attained over 5000 residents to qualify under state rules.  The government is non-partisan and is governed by a charter again written by a group of citizens and presented to the electorate for a vote which was approved.

The town restricts building along the banks of the Rocky River and Plum Creek. It also is physically crossed by two major railroads. CSX a, NE/SW road and Norfolk Southern which is a mainline east–west configuration.  The city's schools are administered by the Olmsted Falls City School District.

Vitamix World Headquarters is located in Olmsted Falls.

Demographics

2010 census
As of the census of 2010, there were 9,024 people, 3,684 households, and 2,431 families residing in the city. The racial makeup of the city was 94.9% White, 2.0% African American, 0.1% Native American, 1.2% Asian, 0.4% from other races, and 1.3% from two or more races. Hispanic or Latino of any race were 2.6% of the population.

There were 3,684 households, of which 32.6% had children under the age of 18 living with them, 52.5% were married couples living together, 11.0% had a female householder with no husband present, 2.6% had a male householder with no wife present, and 34.0% were non-families. 28.8% of all households were made up of individuals, and 9.4% had someone living alone who was 65 years of age or older. The average household size was 2.42 and the average family size was 3.01.

The median age in the city was 41.6 years. 24.5% of residents were under the age of 18; 6.7% were between the ages of 18 and 24; 24.1% were from 25 to 44; 31% were from 45 to 64; and 13.7% were 65 years of age or older. The gender makeup of the city was 46.7% male and 53.3% female.

2000 census
As of the census of 2000, there were 7,962 people, 3,121 households, and 2,228 families residing in the city. The population density was 1,927.2 people per square mile (744.3/km). There were 3,267 housing units at an average density of 790.8 per square mile (305.4/km). The racial makeup of the city was 96.71% White, 1.31% African American, 0.99% Native American, 0.73% Asian, 0.06% Pacific Islander, 0.28% from other races, and 0.88% from two or more races. Hispanic or Latino of any race were 1.51% of the population. As of 2006, the population is estimated to be 10,000+.

There were 3,121 households, out of which 34.4% had children under the age of 18 living with them, 60.2% were married couples living together, 8.7% had a female householder with no husband present, and 28.6% were non-families. 24.8% of all households were made up of individuals, and 6.9% had someone living alone who was 65 years of age or older. The average household size was 2.54 and the average family size was 3.06.

In the city the population was spread out, with 26.6% under the age of 18, 6.2% from 18 to 24, 32.4% from 25 to 44, 24.9% from 45 to 64, and 9.9% who were 65 years of age or older. The median age was 37 years. For every 100 females, there were 92.8 males. For every 100 females age 18 and over, there were 89.2 males.

The median income for a household in the city was $57,826, and the median income for a family was $66,196. Males had a median income of $41,996 versus $35,110 for females. The per capita income for the city was $25,716. About 1.2% of families and 2.1% of the population were below the poverty line, including 1.2% of those under age 18 and 4.5% of those age 65 or over.

Education
The Olmsted Falls school system educates students from Olmsted Falls, parts of Columbia Station, part of Berea, and from neighboring Olmsted Township. There are five schools in the school system, Early Childhood Center, Falls-Lenox Primary School, Olmsted Falls Intermediate School, Olmsted Falls Middle School, and Olmsted Falls High School. The school colors are blue and gold, and their mascot is an English bulldog. The Olmsted Falls School District has recently been nationally recognized for teaching.

Athletics
In December 2000, The Bulldog football team won the Ohio High School Athletic Association Division II State Championship, defeating Piqua 21–0 at Paul Brown Tiger Stadium in Massillon.

The Lady Bulldog volleyball team won the State Championships in 2008.

The Girls Cross Country team won the State Championships in 1980, 1981, and 1987.

Government

Executive
The mayor is the ceremonial head of government. The mayor is full-time and presides over city council meetings, has the power to veto council actions, and also acts as the Safety Director for the city.

James Patrick Graven was elected mayor on December 5, 2017 after receiving over 60% of the vote in a special runoff election. He was narrowly elected to a second term in November 2021.

Legislative
The City Council of Olmsted Falls consists of seven members elected to two year terms; Council President, Council President Pro-Tempore, Council-At-Large, Clerk of Council, representative for Ward 1, representative for Ward 2, representative for Ward 3, and representative for Ward 4. It is a "strong Council - weak Mayor" form of government, with the Mayor not holding any voting rights on Council.

The Current Olmsted Falls City Council as of January 2022 is: Cornel Munteanu, Council President; Brian Chitester, Council Pro-Tempore; Lori Jones, Council-At-Large; Jay McFadden, Council Ward 1; Sean Wolanin, Council Ward 2; Yvonne Buchholz, Council Ward 3; Scott Saari, Council Ward 4

Judicial
The Mayor's Court of Olmsted Falls is located in the City Hall building.

Notable people
Steve Gansey (b. 1985), head coach of the NBA G League College Park Skyhawks

References

External links
City of Olmsted Falls Website
Olmsted Falls City Schools
Grand Pacific Junction Historic and Shopping District

Cities in Ohio
Cities in Cuyahoga County, Ohio
Cleveland metropolitan area